Democratic Republicans (Repubblicani Democratici, RD) is a tiny liberal political party in Italy, led by Giuseppe Ossorio.

The party was founded in 2004 by splinters from the Italian Republican Party (PRI), who wanted to get rid of the alliance with the centre-right House of Freedoms coalition.

History 
At the 2005 regional elections the party presented its list only in Campania, where it gained 1.4% and Ossorio was re-elected to the Regional Council.

In 2005 the party sided with The Union and contested the 2006 general election within the lists of Antonio Di Pietro's Italy of Values (IdV). Consequently, to this pact of federation, Ossorio was elected to the Chamber of Deputies in his home region Campania and sit in the IdV caucus.

On 20 September 2007, Ossorio announced that the Democratic Republicans were joining the centre-left Democratic Party (PD) alongside fellow ex-PRI members of the European Republicans Movement (MRE).

In 2010 the party returned into the PRI's fold.

References

External links
 

Political parties established in 2004
Political parties in Campania
Defunct political parties in Italy
Liberal parties in Italy
2004 establishments in Italy